United Nations Security Council Resolution 18, adopted on February 13, 1947, created a Commission to try to give effect to United Nations General Assembly Resolution 41 which stated that regulation and reduction in world armaments and armed forces is an important measure for strengthening international peace.

The resolution was adopted 10 votes to none, with one abstention from the Soviet Union.

See also
List of United Nations Security Council Resolutions 1 to 100 (1946–1953)

References
Text of the Resolution at undocs.org

External links
 

 0018
Arms control
February 1947 events